Victor Alexis Rivera Santiago (September 17, 1986 - July 1, 2010), better known by his stage name Lele "El Arma Secreta", was a Puerto Rican rapper, singer-songwriter, and drug trafficker who was signed to the Gold Star Music label and later Rottweilas Inc., as well as his independent label Secret Family. He recorded solo or as part of a duo with partner Endo under the name Endo & Lele "Las Armas Secretas".

After discovering his musical talent, Rivera worked in Héctor el Father's Gold Star Music label as a songwriter from 2003 until 2008. He wrote many songs for artists such as Héctor el Father, Yomo, Polaco and Daddy Yankee, but went mostly uncredited with a few exceptions. After the company dissolved, he recorded "O Me Pagas" (featuring Endo), a diss track towards Héctor el Father for allegedly owing him royalties for his work as a songwriter. He went on to sue him for $500,000 over the royalties of more than 40 songs he had written for him, but lost the case. He later went on to work with Cosculluela in his newly funded label Rottweilas Inc., where he both wrote and recorded songs, most of them along with his partner Endo, and he went on to start recording an album as a rapper, while both writing and performing the tracks.

On July 1, 2010, Rivera's body was found inside a car in Trujillo Alto with 24 gunshot wounds. His body was identified by his multiple tattoos, because, according to his mother, "there was not enough left of his face to identify". According to documents from the United States Department of Justice, a leader of drug trafficking organization La ONU orchestrated the murder of Rivera, who was also a member of the same organization.

See also
 List of murdered hip hop musicians

References

1986 births
2010 deaths
People from Carolina, Puerto Rico
Puerto Rican rappers
Puerto Rican singer-songwriters
Puerto Rican reggaeton musicians
Puerto Rican drug traffickers
Deaths by firearm in Puerto Rico